Orlow Seunke (born 22 September 1952) is a Dutch director, screenwriter and producer.

Life and career 
Born in Amsterdam, Seunke studied at the Dutch Film Academy, graduating in 1975. After directing several shorts and TV works, he made his feature film debut in 1982 with the critical acclaimed  The Hes Case, which premiered at the 39th edition of the Venice Film Festival in which it won the Silver Lion for Best First Work, and which later was the recipient several other accolades including the Critics' Award at the Toronto Film Festival and the Bronze Hugo Award at the Chicago International Film Festival. His second work Tracks in the Snow was entered into the main competition at the 42nd Venice International Film Festival and won the Golden Calf Special Jury Prize at the Netherlands Film Festival.

In 2002 Seunke left the Netherlands and moved to Indonesia. Between 2003 and 2006 he was the artistic director of the Jakarta International Film Festival.

Selected filmography
 1982 - The Hes Case
 1985 - Tracks in the Snow
 1991 - Oh Boy!
 1997 - Tropic of Emerald

References

External links
 

1952 births
Living people
People from Amsterdam
Dutch screenwriters
Dutch television directors
Dutch film directors